Marianne Githens (November 10, 1936 – February 27, 2018) was an American political scientist, feminist, and author. She was an Elizabeth Conolly Todd Distinguished Professor and the co-founder of the Women's Study Program at Goucher College. In 1977, she co-authored the anthology A Portrait of Marginality.

Early life and education 
Githens was born in New York City to Anita Keller, a schoolteacher and life-long resident of Cedarhurst, New York and John H. Githens, an accountant. She was raised in Cedarhurst, New York. She had one brother, John Lawrence. She earned a Bachelor of Arts degree from Marymount Manhattan College. After graduation Githens moved to London, where she lived with an emigre German Jewish family near Hampstead Heath. Githens studied at the London School of Economics, earning a doctorate in European political institutions and French political thought in 1960. Her dissertation was titled The Separation of Powers in the Working Constitution of the Fourth Republic.

Career 
Githens taught full-time at Goucher College from 1965 to 2014. She taught part-time until 2016. She was recognized by peers as a "pioneer scholar" in the field of women in politics and public policy. Githens was an advocate for inclusion, diversity, and equity. This advocacy included women's rights and for urban neighborhoods in Baltimore. She was a co-founder of the Women's Studies Program at Goucher and served as the chair of the political science program. In 1977, Githens and Jewel Prestage authored the anthology A Portrait of Marginality. In 1993, Githens was commissioned to write a report on women in Europe by the European Commission's Commission of the European Communities for Program Development. In 2000, Githens was named Goucher College's Elizabeth Conolly Todd Distinguished Professor due to her "leadership, scholarship, teaching and community activism." The appointment provides five years of funds to pursue research.

Personal life 
Githens was a feminist and enjoyed fashion and jewelry. She married Stanley Zenith Mazer in 1973. Mazer was a dean and professor at Baltimore City Community College. The couple met during Parren Mitchell's campaign where they were both were interested in racial equality. Githens and Mazer moved into the Mount Vernon neighborhood in Baltimore in 1994. Githens had two sons and two daughters.

Githens died February 27, 2018, of a heart attack at the age of 83. She was survived by her children, brother, and five grandchildren.

Awards and honors 
Githens received multiple awards from Goucher College, including the Outstanding Teaching Award, Caroline Doebler Bruckerl Faculty Award, and a Human Rights Scholar Award. She was recognized by Marymount Manhattan College with a Distinguished Alumna Award. In 1997, Githens and her husband were presented a preservation project award from Baltimore Heritage.

Selected works

Articles

Books

References

External links 

1936 births
2018 deaths
20th-century American non-fiction writers
20th-century American women writers
21st-century American non-fiction writers
21st-century American women writers
Activists from Maryland
Activists from New York City
Alumni of the London School of Economics
American feminist writers
American women political scientists
American political scientists
American women academics
American women's rights activists
Goucher College faculty and staff
Marymount Manhattan College alumni
People from Baltimore
People from Cedarhurst, New York
Scientists from Baltimore
Scientists from New York City
Writers from Baltimore
American women non-fiction writers